Krummedige is a surname. Notable people with the surname include:

Hartvig Krummedige ( 1400–1476), Danish nobleman
Henrich Krummedige ( 1464–1530), Danish-Norwegian nobleman